Michael Pezzullo,  is an Australian public servant. In October 2014, he was appointed the Secretary of the Department of Immigration and Border Protection. On 20 December 2017, a reshaping of departments led to him taking up the post of Secretary of the Department of Home Affairs. Prior, Pezzullo had been the Chief Executive Officer of the Australian Customs and Border Protection Service.

Education
Pezzullo has a Bachelor of Arts (with Honours) in History from the University of Sydney.

Career
Pezzullo joined the Department of Defence as a graduate in 1987. After five years in the Defence department, Pezzullo discovered "the experience, age and, to some extent, ideological and almost philosophical gap between [him] and the next level up meant [he] would not advance until [he] became crusty, old and cynical," so in 1992 he transferred to the Department of Prime Minister and Cabinet, where he worked in the International Division. 

In 1993 Pezzullo joined the staff of the Minister for Foreign Affairs, Senator Gareth Evans, and remained in Parliament House until December 2001, including as deputy chief of staff to then opposition leader Kim Beazley. In February 2002, he rejoined the Department of Defence and, in 2006, was promoted to the position of Deputy Secretary Strategy in that department. Between February 2008 and May 2009 he led the Defence White Paper team and was principal author of the 2009 Defence White Paper.

In July 2009 Pezzullo joined the Australian Customs and Border Protection Service as chief operating officer, a role which he continued in until September 2012. He was promoted to acting chief executive over the period September 2012 to February 2013 and on 15 February 2013 was employed as the substantive CEO. When appointing Pezzullo, then Home Affairs Minister Jason Clare told media that Customs required major structural change, and Pezzullo had been appointed to drive reforms. In the role, Pezzullo emphasised the importance of border security not only as a security issue, but also as an economic concern. 

On 2 October 2014 Prime Minister Tony Abbott announced that he had made Pezzullo the new Secretary of the Department of Immigration and Border Protection, effective 13 October 2014, replacing Martin Bowles. As immigration secretary, Pezzullo led changes in his department recasting what had been seen as traditional immigration and border security institutions and doctrines.

In April 2021, in an Anzac Day message to staff, Pezzullo said Australia must strive to reduce the likelihood of war "but not at the cost of our precious liberty". His message comes as Defence Minister Peter Dutton says war with China should not be discounted.

Management of conflict of interest
The Sydney Morning Herald reported that early in 2014 Pezzullo's brother, Fabio, escaped a criminal conviction after he confessed to lying to an inquiry investigating corruption at Sydney airport. 

Fabio Pezzullo, a former Customs officer, was fined and placed on a two-year good behaviour bond for perjuring himself before a corruption watchdog. The 42-year-old was charged after an investigation over allegations he sold prescription drugs to fellow Sydney Airport Customs officers and lied to the Australian Commission for Law Enforcement Integrity. The commission was investigating several of his colleagues for drug importation and bribery. Despite being told verbally and in writing not to tell anyone of the summons, Fabio Pezzullo told his flatmate, a former Customs officer. Fabio Pezzullo's sentencing took place in June 2014.

While the case was underway Michael Pezzullo was fulfilling senior executive roles in Customs and Border Protection, but had disclosed the conflict to his minister from the outset. In a note to staff regarding the case he was reported to have said: "from the outset, I asked and expected to be treated as a detached family member with no official rights, interests or powers in the matter." The communique also details the processes that were implemented to manage any real or perceived conflict of interest relating to the case.

References

External links

Official photo (copyright)

Living people
Officers of the Order of Australia
Secretaries of the Australian Government Immigration Department
University of Sydney alumni
Year of birth missing (living people)